Ánimas is a 2018 Spanish thriller film directed and written by Laura Alvea and Jose F. Ortuño.

Cast

Production 
The film is a La Claqueta and Acheron Films production.

Release 
The film was presented in the Noves Visions section of the Sitges Film Festival on 4 October 2018. It was theatrically released in Spain on 5 October 2018.

See also 
 List of Spanish films of 2018

References

External links 
 
 
 

2018 films
Spanish drama films
2010s Spanish-language films
2018 drama films
2010s Spanish films
La Claqueta PC films